This is an alphabetical list of known Hindi songs performed, sung and/or recorded by Mohammed Rafi between 1942 and 1980. Over 5,000 of his songs are listed here. Mohammed Rafi also sang in several other different languages, which might not be included here.  The genre of song is first, followed by any other singers and the music director or lyricist, then Album name and Year released.

Alphabetical song lists 
 Recorded songs (A)
 Recorded songs (B-C)
 Recorded songs (D-F)
 Recorded songs (G)
 Recorded songs (H-I)
 Recorded songs (J)
 Recorded songs (K)
 Recorded songs (L)
 Recorded songs (M)
 Recorded songs (N)
 Recorded songs (O)
 Recorded songs (P-R)
 Recorded songs (S)
 Recorded songs (T)
 Recorded songs (U-Z)

Telugu songs

Kannada songs

Malayalam songs

Punjabi songs

Non-film songs

Marathi songs

Non-film songs

Odia songs

Bengali songs

Non-film songs

Hindi Non-film songs

See also 
 Mohammed Rafi

References

External links 
 Mohammed Rafi Songs: All Music
 Largest Collection Mohammed Rafi Saheb Songs World Records India

Hindi songs
Rafi